The Order of Omar Torrijos Herrera is an order of Panama, named in honor of Omar Torrijos Herrera (1929-1981), who was the Commander of Panamanian Forces of the Panamanian Revolution. It was created by Act No. 23 on 14 December, 1982 and regulated by Executive Decree No. 336 of 13 July, 1995. The regulation was amended by Executive Decree No. 1 of 11 January, 2006.

Classes and ranks
The award is split into civilian and military classes. The civilian class consists of four ranks:
 Extraordinary Grand Cross (Gran Cruz Extraordinaria)
 Grand Cross (Gran Cruz)
 Trustee with plaque (Encomienda con Placa)
 Commander (Comendador)

The military class has three ranks:
 Grand Officer Cross (Gran Cruz de Oficial)
 Grand Silver Cross (Gran Cruz de Plata)
 Knight (Caballero)

Notable recipients
Rod Carew
Fidel Castro
Luiz Inácio Lula da Silva
 Marta Matamoros, Grand Cross
 Cirilo McSween, Extraordinary Grand Cross
Tabaré Vázquez

References

Orders, decorations, and medals of Panama
Orders of chivalry awarded to heads of state, consorts and sovereign family members
Awards established in 1982
1982 establishments in Panama